Merrill Goozner, is an American journalist, author and educator. He served as editor of Modern Healthcare and ModernHealthcare.com, a weekly news magazine and daily news website covering the healthcare industry, from December 2012 to April 2017. Since then, he writes a weekly column for the magazine as well as writes and edits GoozNews, an online newsletter.

His prior career included five years as a printer with the Cincinnati Post; five years as Cincinnati director of the Ohio Public Interest Campaign (and writer/editor of the Cincinnati AFL-CIO Chronicle); a year as reporter for the Hammond (Ind.) Times; four years with Crain's Chicago Business; 13 years with the Chicago Tribune, including four years as Tokyo bureau chief and Chief Asia Correspondent (1991–95) and two years as Chief Economics Correspondent (1998-2000). He subsequently became a professor of business journalism at New York University (2000-2003) and director of the Integrity in Science Project at the Center for Science in the Public Interest (2004-2009).

Personal
Born in 1950 in New York City, Goozner graduated from the University of Cincinnati in 1975 with a bachelor's degree in history and Columbia University's Graduate School of Journalism  in 1982. In 2008, the University of Cincinnati awarded him as Distinguished Alumni Award.

Appearances
Goozner's work has appeared in a number of publications which include, The New York Times, The Washington Post, Columbia Journalism Review, The Nation, The American Prospect and the Washington Monthly.

Books
Goozner is the author of The $800 Million Pill: The Truth Behind the Cost of New Drugs which was published by the University of California Press.

References

External links
GoozNews

American male journalists
1950 births
Living people
Journalists from New York City
20th-century American journalists